Beeper may refer to:

Music 
 "Beeper" (song), the debut single by The Count and Sinden
 The Beepers, an American band
 "Beepers", a song by American rapper Sir Mix-a-Lot from the 1989 album Seminar

Other uses 
 Pager
 Buzzer
 "Beeper", general designation for the small internal speaker (usually piezoelectric) common in early microcomputers like the ZX Spectrum, Apple II Plus, Apple IIe, Acorn Atom, Amstrad PCW, Jupiter Ace, PC-8800 series, etc.
 PC speaker, the internal loudspeaker integrated into most IBM PC compatible computers 
 A device which makes a beep
 Avalanche transceiver
 Beeper (film), a 2002 film

See also
 Beep (disambiguation)